Stylish

Charme may refer to:
 Charme, Wisconsin, United States
 Charmé, Charente, France
 La Charme, Jura, France
 Le Charme, Loiret, France
 Charme (typeface), a foundry type made by Ludwig & Mayer.

See also 
 Charmes (disambiguation)